The 2011 North Carolina Tar Heels baseball team represented the University of North Carolina at Chapel Hill in the 2011 NCAA Division I baseball season. Head Coach Mike Fox was in his 13th year coaching the Tar Heels. They played their home games at Bryson Field at Boshamer Stadium and were members of the Atlantic Coast Conference's Coastal Division.

The Tar Heels reached the 2011 College World Series as the number 3 national seed, where they were eliminated by Vanderbilt.

Personnel

Roster

Schedule

! style="background:white;color:#56A0D3;"| Regular Season
|- valign="top" 

|- align="center" bgcolor="#ccffcc"
| Feb 18 || vs.  || #27 || Dedeaux Field • Los Angeles, CA || W 2–1 || Holt (1–0) || Anderson (0–1) || None ||  || 1–0 || 
|- align="center" bgcolor="#ccffcc"
| Feb 19 || at #12  || #27 || Goodwin Field • Fullerton, CA || W 4–311 || Holt (2–0)|| Floro (0–1) || Penny (1) || 1,756 || 2–0 || 
|- align="center" bgcolor="#ccffcc"
| Feb 20 || vs. Missouri || #27  || Dedeaux Field • Los Angeles, CA || W 11–3 || Smith (1–0) || Hardoin (0–1) || None || 858 || 3–0 || 
|- align="center" bgcolor="#ccffcc"
| Feb 20 || @  || #27  || Dedeaux Field • Los Angeles, CA || W 11–7 || Taylor (1–0) || Smith (0–1) || Penny (2) ||  || 4–0 || 
|- align="center" bgcolor="#ccffcc"
| Feb 25 ||  || #18 || Boshamer Stadium • Chapel Hill, NC || W 10–5 || Munnelly (1–0) || Prosinski (0–1) || None || 1,278 || 5–0 || 
|- align="center" bgcolor="#ccffcc"
| Feb 26 || Seton Hall || #18 || Boshamer Stadium • Chapel Hill, NC || W 7–1 || Johnson (1–0) || Terhune (0–1) || None || 1,692 || 6–0 || 
|- align="center" bgcolor="#ffbbb"
| Feb 27 || Seton Hall || #18 || Boshamer Stadium • Chapel Hill, NC || L 1–3 || Dirocco (2–0) || Morin (0–1) || Harvey (2) || 1,663 ||6–1 || 
|-

|- align="center" bgcolor="#ccffcc"
| Mar 1 ||  || 17 || Boshamer Stadium • Chapel Hill, NC || W 4–2 || Emanuel (1–0) || Rothlin (1–1) || Penny (3) || 372 || 7–1 || 
|- align="center" bgcolor="#ccffcc"
| Mar 2 ||  || 17 || Boshamer Stadium • Chapel Hill, NC || W 14–6 || Stiles (1–0) || Mooney (1–2) || None || 550 || 8–1 || 
|- align="center" bgcolor="#ccffcc"
| Mar 4 ||  || 17 || Boshamer Stadium • Chapel Hill, NC || W 5–1 || Johnson (2–0) || Tropeano (1–1) || Holt (1) || 706 || 9–1 || 
|- align="center" bgcolor="#ccffcc"
| Mar 5 || Stony Brook || 17 || Boshamer Stadium • Chapel Hill, NC || W 18–4 || Munnelly (2–0) || Johnson (1–1) || None || 1,200 || 10–1 || 
|- align="center" bgcolor="#ccffcc"
| Mar 5 || Stony Brook || 17 || Boshamer Stadium • Chapel Hill, NC || W 11–6 || Holt (3–0) || McNitt (0–1) || None || 1,642 || 11–1 || 
|- align="center" bgcolor="#ccffcc"
| Mar 8 ||  || 16 || Boshamer Stadium • Chapel Hill, NC || W 16–0 || Emanuel (2–0) || Clark (0–3) || None || 477 || 12–1 || 
|- align="center" bgcolor="#ccffcc"
| Mar 9 ||  || 16 || Boshamer Stadium • Chapel Hill, NC || W 8–1 || Stiles (2–0) || Kilpatrick (0–2) || None || 199 || 13–1 || 
|- align="center" bgcolor="#ccffcc"
| Mar 11 || @  || 16 || Gene Hooks Field at Wake Forest Baseball Park • Winston-Salem, NC || W 7–1 || Johnson (3–0) || Stadler (0–3) || None || 791 || 14–1 || 1–0
|- align="center" bgcolor="#ffbbb"
| Mar 12 || @ Wake Forest || 16 || Gene Hooks Field at Wake Forest Baseball Park • Winston-Salem, NC || L 2–10 || Cooney (2–1) || Munnelly (2–1) || None || 1,058 || 14–2 || 1–1
|- align="center" bgcolor="#ffbbb"
| Mar 13 || @ Wake Forest || 16 || Gene Hooks Field at Wake Forest Baseball Park • Winston-Salem, NC || L 4–5 || McLeod (1–0) || Emanuel (2–1) || None || 924 || 14–3 || 1–2
|- align="center" bgcolor="#ccffcc"
| Mar 15 ||  || 19 || Boshamer Stadium • Chapel Hill, NC || W 11–2 || Stiles (3–0) || Link (0–1) || None || 397 || 15–3 || 
|- align="center" bgcolor="#ccffcc"
| Mar 18 || @  || 19 || English Field • Blacksburg, VA || W 10–4 || Johnson (4–0) || Mantiply (2–3) || None || 1,724 || 16–3 || 2–2
|- align="center" bgcolor="#ccffcc"
| Mar 19 || @ Virginia Tech || 19 || English Field • Blacksburg, VA || W 5–4 || Emanuel (3–1) || Zecchino (2–2) || Penny (4) || 2,145 || 17–3 || 3–2
|- align="center" bgcolor="#ccffcc"
| Mar 20 || @ Virginia Tech || 19 || English Field • Blacksburg, VA || W 7–6 || Smith (2–0) || Martier (1–1) || Munnelly (1) || 643 || 18–3 || 4–2
|- align="center" bgcolor="#ccffcc"
| Mar 22 ||  || 19 || Boshamer Stadium • Chapel Hill, NC || W 14–2 || Holt (4–0) || Leach (0–1) || None || 1,002 || 19–3 || 
|- align="center" bgcolor="#ccffcc"
| Mar 23 ||  || 19 || Boshamer Stadium • Chapel Hill, NC || W 4–0 || Munnelly (3–1) || Swickle (1–2) || None || 621 || 20–3 || 
|- align="center" bgcolor="#ccffcc"
| Mar 25 ||  || 19 || Boshamer Stadium • Chapel Hill, NC || W 8–5 || Johnson (5–0) || O'Grady (4–1) ||Penny (5) || 1,173 || 21–3 || 5–2
|- align="center" bgcolor="#ccffcc"
| Mar 26 || Duke || 19 || Boshamer Stadium • Chapel Hill, NC || W 11–2 || Emanuel (4–1) || Bebout (2–1) || Holt (2) || 1,507 || 22–3 || 6–2
|- align="center" bgcolor="#ccffcc"
| Mar 27 || Duke || 19 || Boshamer Stadium • Chapel Hill, NC || W 7–611 || Morin (1–1) || Grisz (1–1) || None || 486 || 23–3 || 7–2
|- align="center" bgcolor="#ffbbb"
| Mar 29 || @ Charlotte || 11 || Robert and Mariam Hayes Stadium • Charlotte, NC || L 3–4 || Rothlin (2–2) || Taylor (1–1) || Pilkington (1) || 1,667 || 23–4 || 
|-

|- align="center" bgcolor="#cffcc"
| Apr 1 || #16 Clemson || 11 || Boshamer Stadium • Chapel Hill, NC || W 13–3 || Johnson (6–0) || Weismann (2–4) || None || 1,386 || 24–4 || 8–2
|- align="center" bgcolor="#cffcc"
| Apr 2 || #16 Clemson || 11 || Boshamer Stadium • Chapel Hill, NC || W 9–5 || Morin (2–1) || Moorefield (1–1) || None || 3,014 || 25–4 || 9–2
|- align="center" bgcolor="#cffcc"
| Apr 3 || #16 Clemson || 11 || Boshamer Stadium • Chapel Hill, NC || W 5–4 || Penny (1–0) || Lamb (1–1) || None || 2,912 || 26–4 || 10–2
|- align="center" bgcolor="#cffcc"
| Apr 5 ||  || 9 || Boshamer Stadium • Chapel Hill, NC || W 12–6 || Holt (5–0) || Monteith (0–1) || None || 445 || 27–4 || 
|- align="center" bgcolor="#ffbbb"
| Apr 8 || @ #12  || 9 || Mike Martin Field at Dick Howser Stadium • Tallahassee, FL || L 3–5 || Bennett (2–1) || Morin (2–2) || McGee (5) || 4,828 || 27–5 || 10–3
|- align="center" bgcolor="#cffcc"
| Apr 9 || @ #12 Florida State || 9 || Mike Martin Field at Dick Howser Stadium • Tallahassee, FL || W 8–5 || Taylor (2–1) || Busch (1–1) || Morin (1) || 6,343 || 28–5 || 11–3
|- align="center" bgcolor="#cffcc"
| Apr 10 || @ #12 Florida State || 9 || Mike Martin Field at Dick Howser Stadium • Tallahassee, FL || W 7–6 || Holt (6–0) || Merians (5–2) || Morin (2) || 4,534 || 29–5 || 12–3
|- align="center" bgcolor="#cffcc"
| Apr 12 ||  || 6 || Boshamer Stadium • Chapel Hill, NC || W 5–3 || Morin (3–2) || Mincey (4–2) || None || 1,612 || 30–5 || 
|- align="center" bgcolor="#ffbbb"
| Apr 15 || @  || 6 || Doak Field • Raleigh, NC || L 4–5 || Mazzoni (3–4) || Johnson (6–1) || Overman (3) || 2,775 || 30–6 || 12–4
|- align="center" bgcolor="#ffbbb"
| Apr 16 || @ NC State || 6 || Doak Field • Raleigh, NC || L 7–8 || Ogburn (4–2) || Taylor (2–2) || Overman (4) || 1,727 || 30–7 || 12–5
|- align="center" bgcolor="#ffbbb"
| Apr 17 || @ NC State || 6 || Doak Field • Raleigh, NC || L 2–10 || Chamra (5–0) || Munnelly (3–2) || None || 2,828 || 30–8 || 12–6
|- align="center" bgcolor="#cffcc"
| Apr 19 ||  || 14 || Boshamer Stadium • Chapel Hill, NC || W 8–3 || Emanuel (5–1) || Hessler (1–1) || None || 1,897 || 24–13 || 
|- align="center" bgcolor="#ffbbb"
| Apr 23 || #20  || 14 || Boshamer Stadium • Chapel Hill, NC || L 6–1310 || Miranda (3–1) || Munnelly (3–3) || None || 2,960 || 31–9 || 12–7
|- align="center" bgcolor="#ffbbb"
| Apr 23 || #20 Miami (FL) || 14 || Boshamer Stadium • Chapel Hill, NC || L 3–5 || Whaley (6–2) || Taylor (2–3) || Robinson (4) || 1,011 || 31–10 || 12–8
|- align="center" bgcolor="#cffcc"
| Apr 24 || #20 Miami (FL) || 14 || Boshamer Stadium • Chapel Hill, NC || W 8–1 || Emanuel (6–1) || Encinosa (3–3) || None || 1,418 || 32–10 || 13–8
|- align="center" bgcolor="#cffcc"
| Apr 27 || @ East Carolina || 17 || Clark–LeClair Stadium • Greenville, NC || W 5–4 || Johnson (7–1) || Simmons (5–2) || Morin (3) || 4,470 || 27–14 || 
|-

|- align="center" bgcolor="#ccffcc"
| May 3 ||  || 17 || Boshamer Stadium • Chapel Hill, NC || W 8–1 || Munnelly (4–3) || Wilson (4–1) || None || 572 || 34–10 || 
|- align="center" bgcolor="#ccffcc"
| May 6 ||  || 17 || Boshamer Stadium • Chapel Hill, NC || W 5–0 || Johnson (8–1) || Beck (2–5) || None || 1,422 || 35–10 || 14–8
|- align="center" bgcolor="#ccffcc"
| May 7 || Maryland || 17 || Boshamer Stadium • Chapel Hill, NC || W 5–410 || Morin (4–2) || Wacker (2–4) || None || 2,226 || 36–10 || 15–8
|- align="center" bgcolor="#ccffcc"
| May 8 || Maryland || 17 || Boshamer Stadium • Chapel Hill, NC || W 8–4 || Munnelly (5–3) || Kirkpatrick (2–4) || Morin (4) || 1,047 || 37–10 || 16–8
|- align="center" bgcolor="#ccffcc"
| May 10 || @  || 17 || Brooks Field • Wilmington, NC || W 11–5 || Stiles (4–0) || Bradley (3–4) || None || 1,431 || 38–10 || 
|- align="center" bgcolor="#ccffcc"
| May 11 ||  || 17 || Boshamer Stadium • Chapel Hill, NC || W 4–2 || Smith (3–0) || Roland (1–1) || Morin (5) || 904 || 39–10 || 
|- align="center" bgcolor="#ccffcc"
| May 13 || @ #9  || 17 || Russ Chandler Stadium • Atlanta, GA || W 3–2 || Johnson (9–1) || Pope (10–3) || Morin (6) || 1,280 || 40–10 || 17–8
|- align="center" bgcolor="#ffbbb"
| May 14 || @ #9 Georgia Tech || 17 || Russ Chandler Stadium • Atlanta, GA || L 8–9 || Smelter (2–0) || Holt (6–1) || None || 1,808 || 40–11 || 17–9
|- align="center" bgcolor="#ffbbb"
| May 15 || @ #9 Georgia Tech || 17 || Russ Chandler Stadium • Atlanta, GA || L 0–3 || Farmer (9–2) || Munnelly (5–4) || Bard (7) || 4,225 || 40–12 || 17–10
|- align="center" bgcolor="#ccffcc"
| May 17 ||  || 16 || Boshamer Stadium • Chapel Hill, NC || W 7–2 || Holt (7–1) || Frankoff (1–1) || None || 365 || 41–12 || 
|- align="center" bgcolor="#ccffcc"
| May 19 || #1 Virginia || 16 || Boshamer Stadium • Chapel Hill, NC || W 6–0 || Johnson (10–1) || Winiarski (6–3) || None || 2,017 || 42–12 || 18–10
|- align="center" bgcolor="#ccffcc"
| May 20 || #1 Virginia || 16 || Boshamer Stadium • Chapel Hill, NC || W 2–1 || Orlan (1–0) || Hultzen (9–3) || Morin (7) || 2,941 || 43–12 || 19–10
|- align="center" bgcolor="#ccffcc"
| May 21 || #1 Virginia || 16 || Boshamer Stadium • Chapel Hill, NC || W 3–2 || Munnelly (6–4) || Roberts (10–1) || Morin (8) || 3,537 || 44–12 || 20–10
|-

|-
! style="background:#56A0D3;color:white;"| Post-Season
|- valign="top" 

|- align="center" bgcolor="#ffbbb"
| May 26 || #16 (5)  || 9 || Durham Bulls Athletic Park • Durham, NC || L 5–7 || Salcines (1–0) || Orlan (1–1) || Miranda (13) || 3,259 || 44–13 || 0–1
|- align="center" bgcolor="#ccffcc"
| May 27 || (8)  || 9 || Durham Bulls Athletic Park • Durham, NC || W 9–0 || Johnson (11–1) || Cooney (7–3) || None || 2,473 || 45–13 || 1–1
|- align="center" bgcolor="#ffbbb"
| May 28 || #5 (1) Virginia || 9 || Durham Bulls Athletic Park • Durham, NC || L 2–3 || Mayberry (5–0) || Munnelly (6–5) || Kline (17 || 5,258 || 45–14 || 1–2
|-

|- align="center" bgcolor="#ccffcc"
| June 3 || (4)  || 10 || Boshamer Stadium • Chapel Hill, NC || W 4–0 || Emanuel (7–1) || Bilodeau (10–3) || None || 2,269 || 46–14 || 1–0
|- align="center" bgcolor="#ccffcc"
| June 4 || (3)  || 10 || Boshamer Stadium • Chapel Hill, NC || W 14–0 || Johnson (12–1) || Valadja (7–4) || None || 3,023 || 47–14 || 2–0
|- align="center" bgcolor="#ccffcc"
| June 5 || (3) James Madison || 10 || Boshamer Stadium • Chapel Hill, NC || W 9–3 || Orlan (2–0) || Valadja (7–5) || None || 2,333 || 48–14 || 3–0
|-

|- align="center" bgcolor="#ccffcc"
| June 10 || #13  || 7 || Boshamer Stadium • Chapel Hill, NC || W 5–2 || Johnson (13–1) || Appel (6–7) || Morin (9) || 3,489 || 49–14 || 4–0
|- align="center" bgcolor="#ccffcc"
| June 11 || #13 Stanford || 7 || Boshamer Stadium • Chapel Hill, NC || W 7–5 || Emanuel (8–1) || Pries (6–6) || Morin (10) || 3,749 || 50–14 || 5–0
|-

|- align="center" bgcolor="#ffbbb"
| June 18 || #3 (6) Vanderbilt || 7 || TD Ameritrade Park Omaha • Omaha, NE || L 3–7 || Williams (2–0) || Johnson (13–2) || None || 22,745 || 50–15 || 0–1
|- align="center" bgcolor="#ccffcc"
| June 20 || #5 (7) Texas || 7 || TD Ameritrade Park Omaha • Omaha, NE || W 3–0 || Emanuel (9–1) || Green (8–4) || None || 19,630 || 51–15 || 1–1
|- align="center" bgcolor="#ffbbb"
| June 22 || #3 (6) Vanderbilt || 7 || TD Ameritrade Park Omaha • Omaha, NE || L 1–5 || Hill (6–1) || Holt (7–2)''' || None'' || 24,394 || 51–16 || 1–2
|-

Ranking movements

References

North Carolina Tar Heels
North Carolina Tar Heels baseball seasons
College World Series seasons
North Carolina
North